Kevin Brady Dillon (born August 19, 1965) is an American actor. He is best known for portraying Johnny "Drama" Chase on the HBO comedy series Entourage, Bunny in the war film Platoon, and John Densmore in the musical biopic The Doors. He was nominated for three Primetime Emmy Awards and a Golden Globe Award for his performance on Entourage.

Early life 
Dillon was born in New Rochelle, New York and was raised in Mamaroneck, New York. He is the son of Mary Ellen, a homemaker, and Paul Dillon, a portrait painter, sales manager, and golf coach at Fordham University. He has a sister and four brothers, one of whom is actor Matt Dillon. His paternal grandmother was the sister of comic strip artist Alex Raymond, the creator of Flash Gordon and Jim Raymond, a cartoonist. He is of Irish American descent. He graduated from Mamaroneck High School.

Career 
Dillon began acting in both television and films in the 1980s. In 1983, Dillon played Arnold Norberry in the television film No Big Deal. His first major role was Ed Rooney in the film Heaven Help Us which was directed by Michael Dinner. He received wide attention for his role as the psychopathic soldier Bunny in the 1986 film Platoon. In 1988, he portrayed Brian Flagg in a remake of the 1958 American science fiction film The Blob. It received mixed reviews but was praised for its special effects and has since gained a cult following. Other notable film roles from that period included War Party (1988), No Escape (1994), and The Doors (1991) in which he played drummer John Densmore.

Much of Dillon's work in the 2000s was in television, including the CBS series That's Life as Paul DeLucca and the Fox series 24 as Lonnie McRae. He appeared in the 2006 film Poseidon, a remake of The Poseidon Adventure. He was on Donald J. Trump's Fabulous World of Golf on the Golf Channel in April 2010. He appeared in the family comedy film Hotel for Dogs (2009) which collected $117 million at the worldwide box office.

Dillon co-starred on the HBO comedy drama television series Entourage playing Johnny "Drama" Chase, for which he received  Emmy nominations in 2007, 2008, and 2009. He also received a Golden Globe nomination in 2008 for performing on the show. The series concluded on September 11, 2011 after eight seasons. Dillon reprised his role as Johnny Chase in the series' film adaptation, Entourage (2015). The project was officially announced in 2013, and filming began around Los Angeles in February 2014. It received mixed reviews from critics and grossed $49 million worldwide.

In 2011, Dillon appeared in the CBS comedy sitcom How to Be a Gentleman portraying Iraq war veteran Bert Lansing. In 2018, he appeared in the drama film Dirt and portrayed Jimmy O'Shea in two episodes of police procedural drama series Blue Bloods.

Personal life 
Dillon married actress Jane Stuart in Las Vegas on April 21, 2006. Entourage cast member Jerry Ferrara was his best man and Kevin Connolly, another series co-star, walked Stuart down the aisle after Dillon shouted "Victory!" (a tribute to his character's work on the metafictional TV series Viking Quest). Their first child named Ava was born on May 17, 2006 in Beverly Hills. Dillon also has a daughter, Amy (b. 1991) from a previous relationship. Stuart filed a divorce petition in July 2016. The divorce was finalized in November 2019, and Dillon was ordered to make equalization payments to Stuart totaling $1,705,594 and an additional $242,411 for her share of a brokerage account.

Filmography

Film

Television

Awards and nominations
Primetime Emmy Award

Golden Globe Award

References

External links 
 
 Interview in Complex Magazine
 

1965 births
Living people
20th-century American male actors
21st-century American male actors
American male film actors
American male television actors
American people of British descent
American people of German descent
American people of Irish descent
American people of Scottish descent
Mamaroneck High School alumni
Male actors from New Rochelle, New York
People from Mamaroneck, New York